The Maldives competed at the 1992 Summer Olympics in Barcelona, Spain, from 25 July to 9 August 1992. The delegation's participation in the Barcelona Olympics marked the Maldives' second appearance at the Summer Olympics since their debut at the 1988 Summer Olympics in Seoul, South Korea. Seven athletes competed across two sports; Ahmed Shageef, Mohamed Amir, Hussain Riyaz, Hussein Haleem and Aminath Rishtha in track and field, and Ahmed Imthiyaz and Mohamed Rasheed in swimming. None of the track or swimming athletes advanced past the first round in their events, and no Maldivian has won a medal in any events.

Background
The Maldives is an archipelagic country located in Southern Asia, situated in the Indian Ocean. Formerly a protectorate of the United Kingdom, it gained independence in 1965. The Maldives Olympic Committee was formed in 1985, and was recognized by the International Olympic Committee the same year. The Maldives have participated in every Summer Olympics since its debut in the 1988 Summer Olympics in Seoul. The highest number of Maldivians participating at any single Summer Games was seven at the 1988 Games and the 1992 Games in Barcelona, Spain. No Maldivian has ever won a medal at the Olympics.

The 1992 Summer Olympics were held from 25 July to 9 August 1992. For the 1992 Summer Olympics, the Maldives sent a delegation of seven athletes. The Maldivian team at the 1992 Games featured five track and field athletes and two swimmers. Sprinters Ahmed Shageef, Mohamed Amir, Hussain Riyaz, Hussein Haleem and Aminath Rishtha were chosen to compete in athletic events. Swimmers Ahmed Imthiyaz and Mohamed Rasheed participated in the men's 50 metre freestyle and men's 100 metre freestyle.

Athletics

The Maldives was represented by four male athletes and a female athlete at the 1992 Summer Olympics in athletics: Ahmed Shageef, Mohamed Amir, Hussain Riyaz, Hussein Haleem, and Aminath Rishtha. This was the first olympic appearance for Aminath Rishtha, Mohamed Amir and Hussain Riyaz. The latter two would go on to represent the Maldives at the following 1996 games. This was the second Olympic appearance for Ahmed Shageef and Hussein Haleem. Shageef would go on to represent the Maldives at the 1996 games.

Ahmed Shageef competed in the men's 100 metres and the men's 200 metres. He had previously participated in the 1988 games in Seoul, South Korea and he was the only athlete to participate in two athletic events at the 1992 games. In the men's 100 metres event he was drawn in heat six on 31 July. He finished last out of the eight athletes in his heat, failing to advance to the next round. Overall, he finished 73rd of the 78 athletes that finished. The medals in the event went to athletes from Great Britain, Namibia, and the United States. On 3 August, he took part in the men's 200 metres event and was drawn in heat ten. He finished seventh and last in his heat with a time of 22.54 seconds and did not qualify for later rounds. Overall, he placed 75th out of 77 athletes that finished.

Mohamed Amir competed in the men's 400 metres on 1 August. He was drawn in heat four and finished last out of the eight athletes in his heat with a time of 50.35 seconds, failing to advance to the next round. Overall, he finished 62nd out of 66 athletes that finished. The medals in the event went to athletes from the United States and Kenya.

Hussain Riyaz competed in the men's 800 metres on 1 August, where he finished last out of the eight athletes in his heat, failing to advance to the next round. Overall, he finished 56th out of 57 athletes with a time of 2 minutes and 0.93 seconds. The medals in the event went to athletes from Kenya and the United States.

Hussein Haleem competed in the men's marathon on 9 August. Haleem completed the marathon in three hours, four minutes and sixteen seconds, finishing 86th out of 87 athletes that finished. The medals in the event went to athletes from South Korea, Japan and Germany.

Sprinter Aminath Rishtha was the only female sent by the Maldivian delegation to the 1992 games. She was also the first female sent by the Maldives to the Olympics. She competed in the women's 100 metres on 31 July and was drawn into heat two. She finished last in her heat and did not advance to the next round. Overall she finished last out of 53 athletes that finished.

Men

Women

Swimming

The Maldives was represented by two male swimmers at the 1992 games. Ahmed Imthiyaz and Mohamed Rasheed, both of whom were making their first appearance at the Olympics. They both competed in the men's 50 metre freestyle and men's 100 metre freestyle. In the 50 metre freestyle, Imthiyaz and Rasheed were drawn in heat one and took the last two spots in their heat. Overall, they took the last two spots from 72 swimmers that finished. In the 100 metre freestyle, they were drawn in the first heat and finished last in the heat. Overall, they took the last two spots out of 75 swimmers that finished.

Men

See also
List of Maldivian records in athletics
Maldives at the Olympics

Notes

References

External links
Official Report of the XXV Olympiad

Nations at the 1992 Summer Olympics
1992
1992 in Maldivian sport